The 2006 UCI Women's Road World Cup is the ninth edition of the UCI Women's Road World Cup. Nine of the eleven races from the 2005 World Cup were retained and three new races were added to give a total of twelve races – the most rounds the World Cup had seen. The races that were left off the calendar were the GP of Wales and the Primavera Rosa. The Danish race the L'Heure D'Or Féminine, Sweden's Open de Suède Vårgårda and the Swiss Tour de Berne were the new rounds.

Races

Final standings

Riders

Teams

External links 
 Official site

 
World Cup, UCI Women's Road Cycling
UCI Women's Road World Cup